Hutchinson's mask is a patient's sensation that the face is covered with a mask or a gauzy network like cobwebs. This medical sign is associated with tabes dorsalis affecting the trigeminal nerve (fifth cranial nerve CN V).  It is named in honour of the English physician Sir Jonathan Hutchinson (1828–1913).

References

Medical signs
Symptoms and signs of mental disorders